William McMurray may refer to:

 William McMurray, founder of Fort McMurray, Canada
 William McMurray (engineer) (1929–2006), pioneer in the field of power electronics
 William McMurray (politician) (c. 1813–1868), from New York
 William McMurray (priest) (1810–1894), 19th century Canadian Anglican bishop
 William McMurray (American football), 1900–1906 Wyoming Cowboys football coach
 Bill McMurray (born 1943), Scottish footballer
 Will McMurray (1882–1945), African-American baseball catcher